Papilio lorquinianus, the sea green swallowtail, is a butterfly of the family Papilionidae. It is found in the Moluccas (Morotai, Ternate, Halmahera, Bacan and Seram) and in western Irian Jaya.

Subspecies
Subspecies include:
Papilio lorquinianus albertisi (Oberthür, 1880) (Kapaur, Andai, West Irian)
Papilio lorquinianus esmeae (Parrott, 1985) (Morotai)
Papilio lorquinianus gelia (Jordan, 1909) (Bachan)
Papilio lorquinianus philippus (Wallace, 1865) (Serang)
Papilio lorquinianus boanoensis (Kariya, 1992) (Boano)

Etymology
The name honors Pierre Joseph Michel Lorquin, a French naturalist.

References
Erich Bauer and Thomas Frankenbach, 1998 Schmetterlinge der Erde, Butterflies of the World Part I (1), Papilionidae Papilionidae I: Papilio, Subgenus Achillides, Bhutanitis, Teinopalpus. Edited by Erich Bauer and Thomas Frankenbach.  Keltern: Goecke & Evers; Canterbury: Hillside Books,

External links
 Funet
Etymol

lorquinianus
Butterflies of Asia
Butterflies of Borneo
Butterflies of Java
Butterflies described in 1865
Taxa named by Baron Cajetan von Felder
Taxa named by Rudolf Felder